The men's high jump event at the 2007 Summer Universiade was held on 10–11 August.

Medalists

Results

Qualification
Qualification: 2.23 m (Q) or at least 12 best (q) qualified for the final.

Final

References
Results
Final results

High
2007